Cartridge paper is a type of high-quality heavy paper used for illustration and drawing.  The term "cartridge" refers to the history of the paper originally being used for making paper cartridges for early breechloading firearms.

See also
Paper board

References

External links 
TheFreeDictionary entry

Paper
Stationery
Office equipment